Lansdowne Park Historic District is a national historic district located at Lansdowne, Delaware County, Pennsylvania, USA. The district includes 103 contributing buildings; the majority are residences. Eighty-one of the houses were built between 1889 and 1891, with Queen Anne as the dominant architectural style. The remaining houses were built beterrn 1899 and 1913 and include notable examples of the Dutch Colonial Revival and Georgian Revival styles. The oldest house is the Dickenson Farmstead, a 2½-story dwelling built in 1732 and expanded in 1790. A notable non-residential building located in the district is St. John's Episcopal Church (1901); it closed in 2009.

It was added to the National Register of Historic Places in 1987.

References

Historic districts on the National Register of Historic Places in Pennsylvania
Queen Anne architecture in Pennsylvania
Colonial Revival architecture in Pennsylvania
Historic districts in Delaware County, Pennsylvania
National Register of Historic Places in Delaware County, Pennsylvania
Lansdowne, Pennsylvania